The Prime Minister's Farmer Income Protection Scheme, also known as PM AASHA is an umbrella scheme of the Government of India announced in September 2018 to ensure a price policies such as a minimum support price are fulfilled. It includes the former Price Support Scheme (PSS), a Price Deficiency Payment Scheme (PDPS) and a Private Procurement & Stockist Scheme (PPPS).

See also 

 Deficiency payments

References 

Agriculture in India
Government schemes in India